William J. Whyte is a Scottish retired amateur football forward and wing half who played in the Scottish League for Queen's Park. He was capped by Scotland at amateur level.

References 

Scottish footballers
Scottish Football League players
Queen's Park F.C. players
Association football forwards
Scotland amateur international footballers
Place of birth missing
Association football wing halves
Year of birth missing